Banir is a small town in Kinta District, Perak, Malaysia. It is located along railway line between Ipoh and Tapah Road.

Kinta District
Towns in Perak